Power Engineering is a monthly magazine dedicated to professionals in the field of power engineering and power generation.  Articles are focused on new developments in power plant design, construction and operation in North America.

Power Engineering was published by PennWell Corporation, the largest U.S. publisher of electric power industry books, directories, maps and conferences. In 2018, PennWell was acquired by Clarion Events, a British company owned by The Blackstone Group.

Power Engineering International, also published by PennWell, covers Europe, Asia-Pacific, the Middle East and the rest of the world.

References

External links
 Official website

1896 establishments in the United States
Monthly magazines published in the United States
Energy magazines
Engineering magazines
Magazines established in 1896
Power engineering
Science and technology magazines published in the United States
Magazines published in Oklahoma
Mass media in Tulsa, Oklahoma